The Braille pattern dots-23 is a 6-dot braille cell with the middle and bottom left dots raised, or an 8-dot braille cell with the two middle-left dots raised. It is represented by the Unicode code point U+2806, and in Braille ASCII with the number "2".

Unified Braille

In unified international braille, the braille pattern dots-23 is used to represent a voiced bilabial consonant, such as /b/ or /ɓ/ when multiple letters correspond to these values, and is otherwise assigned as punctuation or accent mark, as needed.

Table of unified braille values

Other braille

Plus dots 7 and 8

Related to Braille pattern dots-23 are Braille patterns 237, 238, and 2378, which are used in 8-dot braille systems, such as Gardner-Salinas and Luxembourgish Braille.

Related 8-dot kantenji patterns

In the Japanese kantenji braille, the standard 8-dot Braille patterns 37, 137, 347, and 1347 are the patterns related to Braille pattern dots-23, since the two additional dots of kantenji patterns 023, 237, and 0237 are placed above the base 6-dot cell, instead of below, as in standard 8-dot braille.

Kantenji using braille patterns 37, 137, 347, or 1347

This listing includes kantenji using Braille pattern dots-23 for all 6349 kanji found in JIS C 6226-1978.

  - 系

Variants and thematic compounds

  -  selector 1 + ゐ/幺  =  乃
  -  selector 4 + ゐ/幺  =  及
  -  selector 5 + ゐ/幺  =  亥
  -  ゐ/幺 + selector 1  =  幼
  -  ゐ/幺 + selector 3  =  幺
  -  ゐ/幺 + selector 4  =  幻
  -  比 + ゐ/幺  =  左

Compounds of 系

  -  な/亻 + ゐ/幺  =  係
  -  こ/子 + ゐ/幺  =  孫
  -  ひ/辶 + こ/子 + ゐ/幺  =  遜
  -  氷/氵 + ゐ/幺  =  潔
  -  へ/⺩ + ゐ/幺  =  素
  -  ろ/十 + ゐ/幺  =  索
  -  た/⽥ + ゐ/幺  =  累
  -  や/疒 + た/⽥ + ゐ/幺  =  瘰
  -  い/糹/#2 + た/⽥ + ゐ/幺  =  縲
  -  む/車 + た/⽥ + ゐ/幺  =  螺
  -  そ/馬 + た/⽥ + ゐ/幺  =  騾
  -  は/辶 + ゐ/幺  =  繁
  -  む/車 + ゐ/幺  =  繋
  -  ち/竹 + ゐ/幺  =  纂
  -  ゐ/幺 + こ/子  =  紅
  -  ゐ/幺 + 龸  =  紋
  -  ゐ/幺 + 仁/亻  =  納
  -  ゐ/幺 + ひ/辶  =  紐
  -  ゐ/幺 + る/忄  =  紺
  -  ゐ/幺 + れ/口  =  結
  -  ゐ/幺 + し/巿  =  絶
  -  ゐ/幺 + ゆ/彳  =  網
  -  ゐ/幺 + ゑ/訁  =  綴
  -  ゐ/幺 + め/目  =  綿
  -  ゐ/幺 + す/発  =  緊
  -  ゐ/幺 + 火  =  緋
  -  ゐ/幺 + 日  =  緒
  -  ゐ/幺 + い/糹/#2  =  緯
  -  ゐ/幺 + そ/馬  =  縁
  -  心 + ゐ/幺 + そ/馬  =  櫞
  -  ゐ/幺 + ら/月  =  縋
  -  ゐ/幺 + え/訁  =  縞
  -  ゐ/幺 + ほ/方  =  縫
  -  ゐ/幺 + た/⽥  =  繹
  -  ゐ/幺 + よ/广  =  纏
  -  ゐ/幺 + ゐ/幺 + よ/广  =  纒
  -  め/目 + ゐ/幺  =  県
  -  め/目 + め/目 + ゐ/幺  =  縣
  -  ゆ/彳 + 宿 + ゐ/幺  =  徽
  -  ゐ/幺 + 宿 + め/目  =  緜
  -  ゐ/幺 + へ/⺩ + は/辶  =  纛
  -  せ/食 + 龸 + ゐ/幺  =  鯀
  -  ゐ/幺 + 宿 + こ/子  =  絳
  -  ゐ/幺 + 龸 + ゑ/訁  =  綬
  -  ゐ/幺 + ほ/方 + そ/馬  =  緲
  -  ら/月 + け/犬 + ゐ/幺  =  縢
  -  ゐ/幺 + 宿 + ろ/十  =  繚
  -  む/車 + 宿 + ゐ/幺  =  辮

Compounds of 乃

  -  の/禾 + ゐ/幺  =  秀
  -  い/糹/#2 + の/禾 + ゐ/幺  =  綉
  -  え/訁 + ゐ/幺  =  誘
  -  ひ/辶 + ゐ/幺  =  透
  -  心 + の/禾 + ゐ/幺  =  莠
  -  か/金 + の/禾 + ゐ/幺  =  銹
  -  ゐ/幺 + て/扌  =  携
  -  な/亻 + selector 1 + ゐ/幺  =  仍
  -  こ/子 + selector 1 + ゐ/幺  =  孕
  -  き/木 + selector 1 + ゐ/幺  =  朶
  -  み/耳 + selector 1 + ゐ/幺  =  躱
  -  ゐ/幺 + 宿 + ⺼  =  盈

Compounds of 及

  -  て/扌 + ゐ/幺  =  扱
  -  れ/口 + ゐ/幺  =  吸
  -  い/糹/#2 + ゐ/幺  =  級
  -  や/疒 + selector 4 + ゐ/幺  =  岌
  -  に/氵 + selector 4 + ゐ/幺  =  汲
  -  ち/竹 + selector 4 + ゐ/幺  =  笈

Compounds of 亥

  -  き/木 + ゐ/幺  =  核
  -  ゑ/訁 + ゐ/幺  =  該
  -  か/金 + ゐ/幺  =  骸
  -  ゐ/幺 + ね/示  =  刻
  -  ゐ/幺 + ぬ/力  =  劾
  -  つ/土 + selector 5 + ゐ/幺  =  垓
  -  こ/子 + selector 5 + ゐ/幺  =  孩
  -  そ/馬 + selector 5 + ゐ/幺  =  駭
  -  れ/口 + 宿 + ゐ/幺  =  咳

Compounds of 幼

  -  て/扌 + ゐ/幺 + selector 1  =  拗
  -  う/宀/#3 + ゐ/幺 + selector 1  =  窈
  -  し/巿 + ゐ/幺 + selector 1  =  黝

Compounds of 幺

  -  ゐ/幺 + ゐ/幺  =  幽
  -  ゆ/彳 + ゐ/幺  =  後
  -  に/氵 + ゐ/幺  =  滋
  -  龸 + ゐ/幺  =  玄
  -  や/疒 + 龸 + ゐ/幺  =  痃
  -  め/目 + 龸 + ゐ/幺  =  眩
  -  い/糹/#2 + 龸 + ゐ/幺  =  絃
  -  ふ/女 + 龸 + ゐ/幺  =  舷
  -  ゆ/彳 + 龸 + ゐ/幺  =  衒
  -  か/金 + 龸 + ゐ/幺  =  鉉
  -  囗 + ゐ/幺  =  畿
  -  ま/石 + ゐ/幺  =  磁
  -  日 + ゐ/幺  =  楽
  -  く/艹 + ゐ/幺  =  薬
  -  く/艹 + く/艹 + ゐ/幺  =  藥
  -  日 + 日 + ゐ/幺  =  樂
  -  て/扌 + 日 + ゐ/幺  =  擽
  -  火 + 日 + ゐ/幺  =  爍
  -  ま/石 + 日 + ゐ/幺  =  礫
  -  む/車 + 日 + ゐ/幺  =  轢
  -  か/金 + 日 + ゐ/幺  =  鑠
  -  心 + 日 + ゐ/幺  =  檪
  -  み/耳 + ゐ/幺  =  蹊
  -  ゐ/幺 + 囗  =  幾
  -  え/訁 + ゐ/幺 + 囗  =  譏
  -  せ/食 + ゐ/幺 + 囗  =  饑
  -  ゐ/幺 + 心  =  慈
  -  ゐ/幺 + や/疒  =  郷
  -  ゐ/幺 + ま/石  =  響
  -  せ/食 + ゐ/幺  =  饗
  -  囗 + ゐ/幺 + や/疒  =  嚮
  -  ゐ/幺 + に/氵  =  渓
  -  ゐ/幺 + ゐ/幺 + に/氵  =  溪
  -  ゐ/幺 + せ/食  =  鶏
  -  ゐ/幺 + ゐ/幺 + せ/食  =  鷄
  -  お/頁 + ゐ/幺  =  顕
  -  お/頁 + お/頁 + ゐ/幺  =  顯
  -  く/艹 + ゐ/幺 + ゐ/幺  =  茲
  -  こ/子 + 宿 + ゐ/幺  =  孳
  -  み/耳 + 龸 + ゐ/幺  =  聨
  -  み/耳 + 宿 + ゐ/幺  =  聯
  -  ゐ/幺 + た/⽥ + selector 1  =  谿
  -  せ/食 + 宿 + ゐ/幺  =  酳
  -  ゐ/幺 + 心 + ま/石  =  麼

Compounds of 左

  -  仁/亻 + ゐ/幺  =  佐

Other compounds

  -  つ/土 + ゐ/幺  =  報
  -  ら/月 + ゐ/幺  =  服
  -  ち/竹 + ら/月 + ゐ/幺  =  箙
  -  そ/馬 + の/禾 + ゐ/幺  =  羲

Notes

Braille patterns